CAPT may refer to:

Canadian Association for Psychodynamic Therapy
Canon Advanced Printing Technology
Captain abbreviation
Celina Aluminum Precision Technology
Center for the Advancement of Process Technology
Child Accident Prevention Trust
Computer-aided pronunciation teaching
Connecticut Academic Performance Test